Maiana is an atoll in Kiribati and is one of the Central Gilbert Islands. The northern and eastern sides of the atoll are a single island, whilst the western edge consists of submerged reefs and many uninhabited islets, all surrounding a lagoon.

Geography 

Most of the 2,027 people who live on Maiana live on the main island; the largest village is Bubutei, at the southern tip of the main island, which is home to 489 people or almost a quarter (24%) of the island's total population.  The population of Maiana is roughly stable and has been around 2,000 people since 1985.

Climate change
Many parts of Maiana suffer from coastal erosion, with the villages of Tekaranga and Tematantongo being particularly affected. Drought is another serious concern as the island's limited freshwater supply comes entirely from the shallow freshwater lens, which becomes salty close to the coast especially during drought periods. Like all of the atolls of Kiribati, Maiana is at serious risk from sea level rise, as even small changes in sea level can cause accelerated erosion and threaten infrastructure, agriculture and water supplies.

Administration

Maiana is administered by an Island Council based in Tebangetua village. The Maiana constituency elects two representatives to the national House of Assembly in the capital of South Tarawa. Until you 2016, the MPs for Maiana are Dr. Anote Tong and Teiwaki Areieta. Dr. Tong was also the President of Kiribati. His son, Vincent Tong, is elected MP in April 2020. Apart from that, the local people of Maiana also have their ruling system that survive from the past. Unimwane Ruling System (Elders or old men ruling system). All villages from Tebikerai to Bubutei have their unimwane represent their villages to the Unimwane Council Body. This body called Tebau-ni-Maiana (The Crown of Maiana, sometimes called the most upper chamber of the Island). Among all Te Unimwane, they will choose the most aging one (older one) as their Baatua (Head of them). They execute rules of the Island that binding people together to follow. This rules and regulations based on the culture and religious belief of Maiana. For example, Uriam Kauongo was a Baatu before he died.

Myths and legends
There are different stories told as to the creation of Maiana and the other islands in the Gilberts. An important legend in the culture of Maiana is that spirits who lived in a tree in Samoa migrated northward carrying branches from the tree, Te Kaintikuaba, which translates as the tree of life. It was these spirits, together with Nareau the Wise who created the islands of Tungaru (the Gilbert Islands).

History
The island was surveyed in 1841 by the US Exploring Expedition.

Maiana Post Office opened around 1925.

Maiana Ferry Disaster
On 13 July 2009, the vessel Uean Te Raoi II, owned by the Catholic Parish of Maiana and travelling from Bwairiki in Tarawa, capsized and foundered off Maiana with the loss of 35 lives.

Notes

References

Exhibit: The Alfred Agate Collection: The United States Exploring Expedition, 1838-1842 from the Navy Art Gallery

Gilbert Islands
Atolls of Kiribati